V. Samudra is a Telugu film director. He started his career as a director with the film Simharasi in 2001 which turned out to be a hit. He directed more than 15 movies which include Chandee, Kakatiyudu and Jai Sena.V Samudra's next film titled as Adheera with Debutant Jai Siddarth.

Filmography

As actor
Rainbow (2008)

References

Living people
21st-century Indian film directors
Telugu film directors
Year of birth missing (living people)